Arvind Kumar is an Indian surgeon and the Chairman of the Institute of Chest Surgery, Chest Onco Surgery and Lung Transplantation at Medanta Hospital, Gurugram and Founder & Managing Trustee, Lung Care Foundation. He is Former Chairman, Center for Chest Surgery and Director, Institute of Robotic Surgery at Sir Ganga Ram Hospital (SGRH) New Delhi (2012 - November 2020).  He is a Former Professor of Surgery & Head of the Thoracic & Robotic Surgery Unit, All India Institute of Medical Sciences (AIIMS), New Delhi (1988-2012). He was President of the Association of Surgeons of India in 2019.

Dr. Arvind Kumar has performed over 11,000 thoracic surgeries, including over 5000 surgeries using the minimally Invasive (key-hole i.e. VATS) and robotic method. He has also performed 2000 complex (high-risk) chest surgeries and over 600 surgeries for thymoma. Surgery in patients with thymoma and myasthenia gravis is one of his areas of expertise. In 2014, he received the Dr. B. C. Roy Award from the President of India Pranab Mukherjee. Dr. Kumar is one of the Executive Board Members for Asian Thoracoscopic Education Platform (ATEP).

In addition to his role as a thoracic surgeon, Dr. Kumar works to combat some of the issues caused by air pollution and climate change. He and his three colleagues have set up the “Lung Care Foundation”, a social impact trust to improve the lung health of the 1.3 billion Indians by increasing awareness and supporting research and healthcare.

Dr. Kumar has been invited by World Health Organisation (WHO) and United Nations (UN) Headquarters for presenting his work.

Early life and education 

Dr. Arvind Kumar was born in Bijnore and did his schooling in Allahabad, Uttar Pradesh. Dr. Kumar completed his MBBS from AIIMS, New Delhi in 1981 and his Masters in Surgery (M.S.) at AIIMS (1984). During the course of his medical education at AIIMS, he was nominated as the "Best Undergraduate Student" (1981) and "Best Postgraduate of the Year" in Surgery (1984).

Unique cases performed 
Dr. Arvind Kumar leads the Center for Chest Surgery at SGRH, which is focused on thoracic and thoracoscopic surgery. The center employs eight thoracic surgeons supported by a nursing team and has an ICU, as well as physiotherapy and other support services. The center's motto is "World’s Best Chest Care with a Humane Touch."

Some of the rare cases operated by a team of doctors under the leadership of Dr. Kumar are:
 21 years old NRI boy studying in New Zealand, had a large tumor in the left bronchus and was advised Pneumonectomy (removal of the lung). He came to us and underwent successful removal of the tumor with reimplantation of the Lung, thus saving his precious lung. 
 23 years old boy with a serious road traffic accident and complete transection of his windpipe (trachea) was refused to be entertained by all major hospitals in Delhi. He was air-lifted to SGRH and in an extremely complex 8 hours operation, his broken windpipe was rejoined successfully. He has returned to normal life.
 A 55 years old man with a huge watermelon size tumor in his chest underwent successful Robotic Surgical Resection, the first of its kind in India, and has returned to normal life.
 53-year-old lady with Thymoma and multiple tumors in the chest underwent a 12-hour-long complex operation using HIPEC, for the first time in India.
 A 48 years old gentleman with a large tumor in his windpipe, who was almost choking to death had successful removal of the tumor under ECMO support, for the first time in India. 
 50 years old gentleman who had undergone removal of the left lung in another hospital and had developed a massive air leak from the stump had key-hole repair of the left main bronchus through a mediastinoscopic approach, the first time in Asia.
 52 year old gentleman with artificial denture swallowed half of his denture with 8 teeth in it.  It got stuck in the lower part of his food pipe. In a breakthrough surgery, Dr. Arvind removed it with Robotic assistance through 3 small holes in the chest and the patient was discharged on 3rd day.
 8 years old child came with a large magnet lying in his right side windpipe (accidentally aspirated). Bronchoscopic removal was unsuccessful at another hospital and the child was turning very sick. He was referred to us and the large magnet was removed by VATS i.e. Key-Hole approach and the torn windpipe was sutured, saving the life of this child. He was discharged 48 hours after this breakthrough surgery.
 40 year old gentleman had the front of his neck transected by an electric wire with the transection of his windpipe and food pipe. Both pipes were successfully repaired using complex plastic surgical techniques with a successful outcome.
 56 year old gentleman had lung cancer on his left side. On routine evaluation, he has been found to have a blockage of blood supply to the heart. So both lung removal (for lung cancer) and Cardiac Bypass Surgery (for blockage of heart vessels) were performed in a single sitting with a successful outcome. It is the first of its kind in India.
23 years old young man presented with severe breathlessness and on evaluation found to have a bilateral pneumothorax (air accumulation in the chest leading to both lungs collapse). A prolonged (7 hours) successful Key-Hole (VATS) surgery was performed on both sides in the same sittings. He was discharged after 72 hours and has returned to his normal life.
A 28 years young lady, with a complex case of bilateral chylothorax (accumulation of chylux fluid in both the chest leading to lung collapse) due to a rare developmental anomaly referred to us from Mumbai. Two complex surgeries were performed on both sides to cure the disease. She was discharged after these major surgeries with excellent outcomes.
Stenosis of Bronchus (Shrinkage of the airway due to Tuberculosis infection) is a very rare and debilitating situation. Dr. Kumar has the largest experience in managing such cases with excellent outcomes.
Traumatic Bronchus transection (transection of the airway due to a massive blow during an accident) is a very rare and life-threatening condition often mistreated and misdiagnosed. A similar case was referred to us after 5 months of the injury with a completely collapsed left lung due to transection of the airway. This young lady underwent a 9 hours of surgery and the airway to the left lung was re-established. After this unique kind of surgery, she attained her normal life.  Not only this case, but more than 10 such rarest of rare cases were also diagnosed, operated on, and successfully managed by Dr. Kumar and his team.
Dr. Kumar probably has one of the highest experiences in Surgery for carinal tumors. This surgery is one of the most complex procedures in Thoracic Surgery and requires vast experience in reconstruction.

Contribution to the field of thoracic surgery 
 Dr. Kumar introduced "Video Assisted Thoracoscopic Surgery" (VATS) in India at AIIMS, New Delhi in the mid-1990s. He then popularized it by lecturing and live demonstrations across the length and breadth of the country. Today, his name is synonymous with VATS in India.
 He performed his first VATS Thymectomy for Myasthenia Gravis and Thymoma at AIIMS, New Delhi in 2000 and most of other VATS procedures i.e. lobectomy for lung cancer, Esophagectomy for Esophageal cancer and other tumor removals by VATS in subsequent years.
 Dr. Arvind Kumar performed the first Robotic Thymectomy for Myasthenia Gravis and Thymoma using the Da Vinci Robotic surgical system at AIIMS, New Delhi in 2008.
 He performed Asia's first Robotic Vascular Surgery i.e. Robotic Aorto Bifemoral Bypass for Atherosclerotic aortic obstruction at SGRH, New Delhi in 2012 along with his vascular surgery team.
 Performed First Robotic lobectomy for lung cancer at SGRH, New Delhi in 2012.
 Performed First Robotic Thyroidectomy i.e. scarless removal of Thyroid Gland in North India at SGRH, New Delhi, 2013.
 Performed Robotic plication of the Diaphragm for the first time in India at SGRH, New Delhi in 2013.
 Performed Robotic repair of diaphragmatic hernia for the first time in India at SGRH, New Delhi in 2013.
 He has India's largest series of various VATS surgeries like Decortication for Empyema, Blebectomy and Bullectomy for Pneumothorax, removal of mediastinal and cystic tumors & resection for aspergilloma.
 He has India's largest series of robotic resection of giant thymoma (more than 10 cm). Many of these cases have involvement of great vessels of the heart and we are the only center in the country where resection of great vessels is performed to achieve complete Thymoma removal.

Contribution to the society 
Apart from being a renowned Thoracic Surgeon, Prof. Kumar has also moved into primary and secondary prevention of Chest diseases through Lung Care Foundation (LCF) a social impact trust dedicated to working for the dissemination of information about POLLUTION and LUNG DISEASES to the masses, basic and clinical research in the field of Chest diseases and provision of state of the art Chest Care to one and all.

During the last 5 years, LCF has covered a wide range of activities, including several awareness and Clinical programs like:
 Free Chest Disease detection & treatment camps.
Free School Health Programs by addressing a massive number of school children from Private and Government Schools in Delhi.
Guinness World Record for the largest human image of an organ by 5003 School Children from over 35 different schools from Delhi-NCR breaking previous records of China and U.A.E on 23 December 2017 at Thyagraj Stadium Delhi.
B.E.S.T (Breathe Easy Stay Tough) School Clubs a Unique initiative led by School Children to effectively empower them by making them Lung Ambassadors in the fight against air pollution.
Asthma Manual for Schools- provides detailed information on Asthma, its triggers, emergency medical care, myths, Asthma Policy for schools, Asthma checklist, and Emergency Response Plan for Asthma attacks and is available in 11 regional languages.
Doctors for Clean Air (DFCA) – a network of passionate doctors from various states of India, working as advocates for Clean Air.
Saaf Hawa Aur Nagrik (SHAN)- A unique, Social awareness program to educate the masses in delhi-ncr about the ill effects of air pollution being run in collaboration with the American Embassy in New Delhi.

Contribution to medical teaching in India 
As a faculty member, in the Department of Surgery at AIIMS, New Delhi (1988-2012), Dr. Kumar traveled extensively across the country and lectured to Medical students, postgraduates, and surgeons on Contemporary topics in surgery. Post Graduate medical teaching was always his focus of attention. Since 2013, he has been a National Coordinator (along with Dr. Santhosh Abraham) for the Postgraduate teaching program of the Association of Surgeons of India and has conducted successful CMEs for thousands of Surgery Postgraduates across the country.

Training and fellowships 
International Fellowships
 Lung Transplant Fellow: Chest Service, University of Florida, Gainesville (USA), 1995.
 ICRETT (Cancer) Fellow: Chest Service, Memorial Sloan Kettering Cancer Centre, New York (USA), 1997.
 WHO Fellow: Chest Service, University of St. Louis, St. Louis, Missouri, USA, 1999.
 WHO Fellow: Chest Service, St. Peter's Hospital, New Jersey, USA, 1999.
 WHO Fellow: Chest Trauma Unit, Liverpool Hospital, Sydney (Australia), 2006.
 Robotic Surgery Training: International School of Robotic Surgery, Grosseto- Italy, 2007.
 Robotic Chest Surgery Training: European Association for Cardio-Thoracic Surgery, Bern, Switzerland, 2008.
 Robotic Surgery Training: I.R.C.A.D., Strasbourg, France, 2012.
 Robotic Vascular Surgery Training: Na- Homolce Hospital, Prague, Czech Republic, 2012.
 Robotic Thyroid Surgery Training: YONSEI University Health System, Seoul, Korea, 2012.

National awards 
 Awarded "Dr. V. Ramalingaswamy prize" for being the "Best undergraduate of the year" in the Department of Community Medicine at AIIMS, New Delhi (1980).
 Nominated for "Sir Hiralal Gold medal" for being the "Best Postgraduate of the Year" in the Deptt, of Surgery at AIIMS, New Delhi (1984).
 Awarded "Khandelwal junior Oncology award for Scientific Excellence" for the paper entitled "Esophageal Carcinoma – How much to resect _ Is it a Non-Issue" at the Fifth biennial conference of the Indian Society of Oncology at Chennai, India (1992).
 Awarded "Raj Nanda Fellowship" by the Raj Nanda Pulmonary Disease Research Trust in association with the British Thoracic Society (2006).
 Awarded "Dr. A.K. Sen Sarma Endowment Lecture" by the Association of Surgeons of India (2008).
 Awarded "Dr. N Mohan Das Memorial Oration" by the Association of Surgeons of India(2010).
 Awarded "Dr. Das Mohapatra Oration" by the Association of Surgeons of India(2013).
Awarded “Presidential Oration-2019” by the Association of Surgeons of India (2019).
Awarded "Dr. PK Sen Memorial Oration" by the Association of Surgeons of India(2017).
Awarded “ASI-Betadine Lifetime Achievement Award” by the Association of Surgeons of India (2019).
Awarded “ASI Social Services Award 2019” by the Association of Surgeons of India (2019).
 Awarded the most prestigious "Dr. B.C. Roy Award" by the Government of India in the category "Eminent Medical Person of the year 2014".

References

External links 

 About Dr. (Prof) Arvind Kumar Director, Institute of Robotic Surgery at Sir Ganga Ram Hospital 

1958 births
Living people
Indian thoracic surgeons
Medical doctors from Delhi
Dr. B. C. Roy Award winners